USS Benjamin Franklin (SSBN 640), the lead ship of her class of ballistic missile submarine, was the only submarine of the United States Navy to be named for Benjamin Franklin (1706–1790), the American journalist, publisher, author, philanthropist, abolitionist, public servant, scientist, librarian, diplomat, inventor, and Founding Father.

Construction and commissioning
The contract to build Benjamin Franklin was awarded to the Electric Boat Division of General Dynamics Corporation in Groton, Connecticut, on 1 November 1962 and her keel was laid down there on 25 May 1963. She was launched on 5 December 1964, sponsored by Mrs. Francis L. Moseley and Mrs. Leon V. Chaplin, great, great, great, great, great-granddaughters of Benjamin Franklin, and commissioned on 22 October 1965, with Captain Donald M. Miller commanding the Blue Crew and Commander Ross N. Williams commanding the Gold Crew.

Service history
On 6 December 1965 the Gold Crew successfully launched a Polaris A-3 ballistic missile in close coordination with an orbital pass of the Gemini 7 astronauts Frank Borman and Jim Lovell.

History needed for 1965–1993.

Decommissioning and disposal
Benjamin Franklin was decommissioned on 23 November 1993 and stricken from the Naval Vessel Register the same day. Her scrapping via the Nuclear-Powered Ship and Submarine Recycling Program in Bremerton, Washington, was completed on 21 August 1995.

Notes

References 

 

Ships built in Groton, Connecticut
Benjamin Franklin-class submarines
Cold War submarines of the United States
Nuclear submarines of the United States Navy
1964 ships
Benjamin Franklin
Ships named for Founding Fathers of the United States